Blackout in Gretley is a 1942 spy thriller novel by the British writer J.B. Priestley. The plot revolves around Nazi espionage in an industrial Midlands town.

References

Bibliography
 Klein, Holger. J.B. Priestley's Fiction. Peter Lang, 2002.

1942 British novels
British thriller novels
British spy novels
Novels by J. B. Priestley
Heinemann (publisher) books